Membrane-mediated anesthesia or anaesthesia (UK) is a mechanism of action that involves an anesthetic exerting its effects through the lipid membrane. Established mechanism exists for both general and local anesthetics. The anesthetic binding site is within ordered lipids and binding disrupts the function of the ordered lipid.  The contribution of membrane-mediated anesthesia, relative to other mechanisms, is not yet clear. See Theories of general anaesthetic action for a broader discussion of purely theoretical mechanisms.

General anesthetics
Inhaled anesthetics partition into the membrane and disrupt the function of ordered lipids. Membranes, like proteins are composed of ordered and disordered regions. The ordered region of the membrane contain a palmitate binding site that drives the association of palmitoylated proteins to clusters of GM1 lipids (sometimes referred to as lipid rafts). Palmitate's binding to lipid rafts regulates the affinity of most proteins to lipid rafts. Inhaled anesthetics partition into the lipid membrane and disrupt the binding of palmitate to GM1 lipids. The clusters of GM1 lipids persist, but they lose their ability to bind palmitoylated proteins.

PLD2 pathway
Phospholipase D2 (PLD2) is a palmitoylated protein that is activated by substrate presentation. Anesthetics cause PLD2 to move from GM1 lipids , where it lacks access to its substrate, to a PIP2 domain which has abundant PLD2 substrate. Animals with genetically depleted PLD2 were significantly resistant to anesthetics. The anesthetics xenon, chloroform, isofluorane, and propofol all activate PLD in cultured cells.

PLD2's effect on ion channels PLD2 binds to the anesthetic sensitive ion channel TREK-1. The product of PLD2, phosphatidic acid (PA) directly activates TREK-1. The anesthetic sensitivity of TREK-1 was shown to be through PLD2 and the sensitivity could be transferred to TRAAK, an otherwise anesthetic insensitive channel.

PLD2 Independent pathway
The anesthetics hydroxychloroquine, tetracain, and lidocaine blocked entry of palmitoylated protein into the endocytic pathway. GM1 clusters and cholesterol are factors that increase endocytosis, and blocking access to endocytosis is a PLD2 independent affect on membranes.

Local anesthetics
Local anesthetics disrupt ordered lipid domains and this can cause PLD2 to leave a lipid raft. They also disrupt protein interactions with PIP2.

History
More than 100 years ago, a unifying theory of anesthesia was proposed based on the oil partition coefficient. In the 70s this concept was extended to the disruption of lipid partitioning. Partitioning itself is an integral part of forming the ordered domains in the membrane, and the proposed mechanism is very close to the current thinking, but the partitioning itself is not the target of the anesthetics. At clinical concentration, the anesthetics do not inhibit lipid partitioning. Rather they inhibit the order within the partition and or compete for the palmitate binding site. Nonetheless, several of the early conceptual ideas about how disruption of lipid partitioning could affect an ion channel, appear to have merit.

References

Anesthesia